Facundo Argüello and Nicolás Kicker were the defending champions but only Argüello chose to defend his title, partnering Gonzalo Escobar. Argüello withdrew in the qualifying competition.

Scott Lipsky and Jürgen Melzer won the title after defeating Stefan Kozlov and Peter Polansky 6–2, 6–4 in the final.

Seeds

Draw

References
 Main Draw
 Qualifying Draw

Sarasota Open - Doubles
2017 Doubles